Princess Rosella is widely considered to be the first ever female protagonist in a graphic adventure game or one of the very first at least. She appeared as the main and titular protagonist of the 1988 adventure game, King's Quest IV: The Perils of Rosella, and co-protagonist (along with her mother Queen Valanice) in a later sequel in the franchise, 1994's King's Quest VII: The Princeless Bride, in addition to appearing in other games and books in the series as well as cameoing in other non-franchise games. Created by Roberta Williams, the character was also the first female character to feature in Williams's King's Quest franchise.

Overview

Background 
Rosella is the daughter of King Graham and Queen Valanice of Daventry, twin sister of Prince Alexander, granddaughter of Prince Cedric and Coignice on her mother's side, and Sir Hereward on her father's. She is married to Edgar. She also has a son, Gart, in the rebooted games. Rosella is the Princess of the Realm and the heir to the throne of Daventry. Her formal name and title is Princess Rosella of Daventry or Rosella of Daventry. Her name means "little rose".

Games 
Rosella would be a playable character in both King's Quest IV and King's Quest VII and appears as an NPC in King's Quest III and King's Quest V. The character also appears in King's Quest novels, including "See No Weevil", where she is the central character. Additionally, she briefly appears in Leisure Suit Larry 2 as a joke, in Hoyle's Official Book of Games, and in the rebooted King's Quest episodic game series by The Odd Gentlemen, as well as numerous unofficial King's Quest fan games, including The Silver Lining.

The daughter of King Graham of Daventry (the protagonist of the first two King's Quest games) the character of Rosella was introduced as an NPC at the end of King's Quest III: To Heir Is Human, where she was rescued by her newly-discovered brother (and the game's central protagonist), Prince Alexander. It has been suggested that, despite being somewhat of a helpless damsel in distress in that game, she was every bit the equal to her brother with as much chance to inherit the throne. This was apparent in the ending scene where King Graham tosses his hat to both Alexander and Rosella, showing gender equity. Indeed, it would be Rosella, not Alexander, who would become the central character in the very next game.

Released in 1988, King's Quest IV was one of the first games not only to feature a female character in general, but also sound card support, and a day and night cycle. The protagonist, Princess Rosella, is the daughter of King Graham (who starred in the first two games and would later star in the fifth) and brother to Prince Alexander (star of the third and later the sixth). Rosella faced dual quests over a twenty-four-hour period - she had to find the fruit of the tree of life to save her dying father and also a magical talisman to save a fairy queen’s life. Unlike most typical princesses in fiction, often depicted as damsels in distress, Rosella was not being rescued; she was doing the rescuing!

Rosella would also appear in King's Quest V, returning to NPC status, and be mentioned in King's Quest VI, with her male counterparts - her father, King Graham, in V; and her brother, Prince Alexander, in VI - again taking the lead roles, as they did in Parts II and III. Rosella would return as a protagonist and playable character in King's Quest VII, this time sharing the role with her mother Queen Valanice, the only time a King's Quest game would have two main playable protagonists and another first for the company as it featured two female protagonists.

References

External links
Information on King's Quest games | Sierra Planet

Adventure game characters
Princess characters in video games
Female characters in video games
Characters in pulp fiction
Video game characters introduced in 1986
King's Quest
Video game protagonists